Marc Robert Salvati (born 5 March 1983) is an English former professional footballer who played as a midfielder in the Football League for York City, in non-League football for Whitby Town, and was on the books of Manchester United without making a league appearance.

References

External links

1983 births
Living people
Footballers from Middlesbrough
English footballers
Association football midfielders
Manchester United F.C. players
York City F.C. players
Whitby Town F.C. players
English Football League players